The Chinese Ambassador to Lebanon is the official representative of the People's Republic of China to the Lebanese Republic.

List of representatives

References 

 
Lebanon
China